Bruera is a village in Cheshire, England. It is located between the two villages of Saighton and Aldford. Bruera is about six miles south of Chester and belongs to the Estate of the Duke of Westminster.

Buildings and Churches 
St. Mary's Church is a small Church listed in the National Heritage List for England as a Grade II building.

Churton Heath Farm B&B is a historic hotel located on Chapel Lane.

References

External links

Villages in Cheshire
Cheshire West and Chester